The 2012–13 Hartford Hawks men's basketball team  represented the University of Hartford during the 2012–13 NCAA Division I men's basketball season. The Hawks, led by third year head coach John Gallagher, played their home games at the Chase Arena at Reich Family Pavilion and were members of the America East Conference. They finished the season 17–14, 10–6 in America East play to finish in fourth place. They lost in the quarterfinals of the America East tournament to UMBC. They were invited to the 2013 CIT, their first ever Division I postseason appearance, where they lost in the first round to Rider.

Roster

Schedule

|-
!colspan=9 style=| Non-conference regular season

|-
!colspan=9 style=| America East Men's tournament

|-
!colspan=9| 2013 CIT

References

Hartford Hawks men's basketball seasons
Hartford
Hartford
Hartford Hawks
Hartford Hawks